The Hisar (Turkish: "fortress") is a family of short, medium and long-range surface-to-air missile systems being developed by Roketsan and Aselsan since 2007. The missiles are developed by Roketsan, while most sensors and electronics are developed by Aselsan. The missile family consists of the short range Hisar-A, medium range Hisar-O, the 100 km long range Hisar-U and the 150 km air defence system SİPER. Missile seeker of Hisar-A and Hisar-O is infrared homing.

Development history
On 18 April 2007, the Turkish Presidency of Defense Industries issued a request for information to international and domestic defence companies to meet a low to medium altitude air defense requirements under Turkey's Low Altitude Air Defence Missile System (T-LALADMIS) programme (Alçak İrtifa Hava Savunma Füze Sistemi in Turkish). A total of 18 companies responded to the RFI.

A subsequent request for proposal was issued on 28 September 2008, for the direct acquisition of 18 systems and options for up to 27 additional systems.
Following the initial missile tests of which was held for Hisar-A in 2013 and Hisar-O  in 2014 the system got into production phase. The final contract was eventually awarded to Aselsan as the prime contractor on 20 June 2015. Other sub-contractors include Tübitak Sage for warhead and battery and Meteksan Savunma for data link. The award consist of a low-altitude system for 314,9 million euros and a medium-altitude system (T-MALADMIS) for 241,4 million euros.

In a test on 7 December 2017, a steep-trajectory firing was carried out for the first time from the HİSAR systems, while their 360-degrees protection was also tested successfully. Flight and ballistic tests were also carried out. For the first time in the campaign, within which control and guidance capabilities of the HİSAR missiles met expectations, radar, command-control and fire control, electro-optic and communications elements of the HİSAR systems were also included for the first time. Target aircraft, target detection and follow-up, command and fire control and mid-range bombsight tests were successfully performed.

In September 2020, Ismail Demir announced that improved versions of Hisar A and O as A+ and O+ were developed after feedback regarding the missiles' performance. He also stated that a variant would be developed to fill the gap between Hisar O and Hisar U. Demir also revealed that Hisar-A will enter the inventory in 2020, in a press conference in Ankara.

Ismail Demir announced that the before the Siper would come a 100 km variant (Hisar-U) would come

Test and development timeline 
 On 20 June 2015, Aselsan was awarded with a contract to produce Hisar surface to-air missile.
 On 8 December 2016, Hisar-O conducted its first missile test successfully.
 On 7 December 2017, a steep-trajectory firing test conducted.
 On 1 February 2018, Hisar-A conducted a successful missile test in Aksaray province of Turkey. 
 On 12 October 2019, Hisar-A finish its final development tests and approved by the defence ministry for mass production. 
 On 16 December 2020, the Hisar-A+ made its final test in order to be in the inventory.
 On 6 January 2020, the Hisar-A+ started mass production.
On 9 March 2021, the Hisar-O medium-range air defense systems passes high altitude tests.
On 26 March 2021, the Hisar-A+ hits a target drone in a test-firing of the air defense systems.
 On 3 May 2021, the Hisar-A+ air defense missile system successfully conducted its acceptance tests in Aksaray Shooting Range and got into the inventory of the Turkish Armed Forces. 
On 12 July 2021, the President of Defense Industries Prof. İsmail Demir announced that Hisar—A+ and Hisar-O+ are in mass production by Rocketsan and Aselsan.

Operational history
On 3 March 2020, Turkey said the system would be deployed in Syria's Idlib province as part of Operation Spring Shield. Turkey has deployed a battery of HISAR-A+ to protect its troop stationed in Libya.

Hisar-A
Hisar-A (Turkish: Alçak İrtifa Hava Savunma Füze Sistemi) is based on an FNSS ACV-30 tracked vehicle chassis armed with four vertical launched Hisar-A short-range missiles supplied by Roketsan. The tracked Hisar-A system mounts its own mast-mounted Aselsan MAR radar 
and an electro-optic/infrared (EO/IR) system, allowing it to operate as an independent standalone system without the need to operate as a battery with a separate FCS. Hisar-A has dual pulse solid propellant rocket motor, and so will be effective and highly maneuverable air targets, but 5 km altitude. However, Roketsan recently improved the missile and called it Hisar A+, although its range is still 15 km, the altitude has changed from 5 km to 8 km, and proximity fuse was changed from laser to RF by TÜBİTAK SAGE, and seeker is not changed and made by Aselsan with IIR, highly resistant to counter measure systems. Test video has shown that missile hit the target with second fire rocket motor and speed up of missile and detonated at proximity of the target, not a direct hit. Hisar-A have midcourse guidance with INS and RF data link, terminal guidance with IIR. Some platforms will be continue with Hisar-A, the others will use Hisar-A+, additionally some platforms will use both Hisar-A+ and Hisar-O missiles so will gain more flexibility.

 Minimum range: 2 km
 Maximum range: 15 km
Maximum altitude: 5 / 8 km

It was announced in 2020 that some orders on HİSAR-A would be replaced in favour of HİSAR-O which has a slightly longer effective engagement range and higher maximum altitude despite the size staying the same.

Hisar-O

Hisar-O (Turkish: Orta İrtifa Hava Savunma Füze Sistemi) is a vertical launched medium-range SAM system mounted on a Mercedes-Benz Zetros chassis.

Hisar-O missile system is very similar to Hisar-A family, and use same systems-III seeker, RF link, fuse, dual pulse rocket motor-but dimensions of the missile are bigger and the range is improved. Another difference is Hisar-O system used Aselsan Kalkan phased array 3D search and track radar. There will be a variant of Hisar-O, which is called Hisar-O+.

The Hisar-O has the capability to detect targets, track, identify and perform command and control, and fire control functions autonomously. The missile system is effective against fighter aircraft, attack helicopters, cruise missiles and unmanned aerial vehicles.

The system's general features also include management and distribution of command and control information, air defense mission planning at the battery and battalion levels, multiple engagement and successive firing, data links for midcourse guidance, integrated air picture generation, operational capabilities in the day, at night and in adverse weather conditions, a global positioning system (GPS) and navigation, remote control, wired or wireless communication between systems, 360° effective area with the capability of vertical launch, Multi-Target Multi-Radar fusion and embedded simulation, identification friend or foe (IFF), modular structure, hybrid control system.

 Minimum range of the missile: 3 km
 Maximum range of the missile: 25 km
 Maximum altitude of the missile: 15 km
 Fighter detection & track range : 40–60  km
 Number of tracks : > 60 targets
 Ready to fire missiles:
Per vehicle: 6
Battery level: ≥ 18 (3 missile launcher vehicles)
Battalion level: ≥ 54 (9 missile launcher vehicles)
Guidance:
Midcourse guidance: Inertial navigation through data link from fire-control system
Terminal guidance: Infrared homing missile seeker
Vehicles types used by Hisar-O system:
Kalkan phased array 3D radar vehicle
Electro-optical suit vehicle
Tactical data link connection system vehicle
Fire control center vehicle
Missile launcher vehicle

Hisar-U
Hisar-U (Turkish: Uzun Menzilli Hava Savunma Füze Sistemi) is a long-range SAM system being developed at National Technology Development Infrastructures. It is mounted on 8x8 MAN Türkiye trucks. 
 Minimum range: 30 km
 Maximum range: 70 km

Siper 
Siper (meaning "trench") is a 150+ km long-range SAM being developed at National Technology Development Infrastructures. Ismail Demir announced that the 100 km range HISAR-U would enter service before SİPER. It is planned to enter service in 2023. The system will have the capacity to fight aircraft, cruise missiles, air-to-ground missiles and unmanned aerial vehicles.

Hisar-RF
Probably a new missile called Hisar-RF is under development. According to one source, Hisar-RF is the radar seeker variant of Hisar-O which first tested in August 2020.

Foreign interest 
Bangladesh has expressed interest in the Hisar-O air defense system.

Indonesia has signed a contract for the purchase of a variant of the Hisar-O and Hisar-U surface-to-air missile system from Turkish defense company Roketsan at Indo Defence 2022, the system is known as Trisula-O and Trisula-U, and its made specifically for Indonesia's demands, request, and needs.

See also
 Aster
 CAMM
 NASAMS
 VL MICA
 SPYDER
 Barak 8
 Multi-Mission Launcher
 VL-SRSAM
 Khordad 15
 MIM-104 Patriot

References

External links
 HISAR-g MEDIUM RANGE AIR DEFENSE MISSILE SYSTEM
 
 HİSAR Air Defence Missiles

Surface-to-air missiles of Turkey
21st-century surface-to-air missiles
Aselsan products
Roketsan products
Weapons and ammunition introduced in 2021